Horace H. "H.H." Witherstine (April 2, 1852 – October 2, 1924) was an American physician and politician.

Born in Herkimer, New York, he attended Fairfield Academy, then moved to Rochester, Minnesota in 1872 where he was a school teacher. In 1884, he received his medical degree from Rush Medical College and returned to Rochester to practice medicine. He was mayor of Rochester from 1892–1895, 1896–1897 and 1902–1903, served on the school board, and was editor of the Rochester Bulletin newspaper. From 1903–1910, he served in the Minnesota State Senate as a Democrat. He died in an auto accident two miles north of Rochester while on a house call.

Notes

1852 births
1924 deaths
People from Herkimer, New York
Rush Medical College alumni
Editors of Minnesota newspapers
Educators from Minnesota
Physicians from Minnesota
Mayors of Rochester, Minnesota
School board members in Minnesota
Democratic Party Minnesota state senators
Road incident deaths in Minnesota
Educators from New York (state)